The University of Turbat (UOT) is a public university situated in Turbat, Balochistan, Pakistan. University of Turbat is the second General University in public sector, chartered by the Government of Balochistan vide Act 2012 passed by the Balochistan Provincial Assembly in May, 2012. The main objective of the establishment of the University of Turbat in the Mekran region in Balochistan is to provide better opportunities of higher education to the students of Turbat (Kech) and adjoining districts of Panjgur, Gwadar and Awaran. With the establishment of the University of Turbat, substantial number of students will be enrolled initially from different parts of province mainly from Mekran will have a direct effect on the social environment of the families of the students and indirectly to the society. With the introduction of market valued subjects, about 500 job opportunities annually would be created directly benefiting the social wellbeing of a segment of the population in the region.   The first vice chancellor of the university was Prof. Dr. Abdul Razzaq Sabir (TI).

Campuses
University of Turbat, Kech
University of Turbat, Gwadar campus
University of Turbat, Panjgur Campus

Degree programs
1. L.L.B. (5 year)
2. L.L.B. (3 year)
3. B.S.C.S
4. M.C.S.
5. B.S. Commerce
6. M. Com.
7. B.B.A.
8. M.S. Management Sciences
9. B.S. chemistry
10. B.S. Biochemistry
11. BS Biotechnology
12. M.Phil. Chemistry
13. B.S. Balochi
14. M.Phil. Balochi
15. M.A. Balochi
16. B.S. Economics
17. M.A. Economics
18. M.Sc. Chemistry
19. M.B.A.
20. M.A. English
21. B.S. English
22. M.A. Political Sciences
23. B.S. Political Sciences
24. B.Ed. (Elementary)
25. M.Ed.
26. B.Ed. (2 year after B.A.)
     B.Ed. (1.5 year, after 16 year education)
27. B.S. Botany

Number of students
3400

Departments
1. Department of Law
2. Department of Computer Sciences
3. Department of Management Sciences
4. Department of Commerce 
5. Department of Economics
6. Department of English
7. Department  of Balochi
8. Department of Political Sciences
9. Department of Chemistry
10. Department of Bio- Chemistry
11. Department of Bio Technology
12. Department of Botany
13. Department of Education
14. Department of Sociology
15. Department of History

See also
List of universities in Pakistan

References

External links
 UOT official website

Educational institutions established in 2012
2012 establishments in Pakistan
Public universities and colleges in Balochistan, Pakistan
Kech District